Paul Amiot  (29 March 1886 – 26 January 1979) was a French film actor. His career spanned some 63 years and he appeared in nearly 100 films between 1910 and 1973.

In 1920 he appeared in Robert Péguy's Être aimé pour soi-même. He was noted for his consistent roles as a figures of authority. He regularly played police inspectors or detectives, lawyers and physicians. He starred in some 100 films between 1908 and 1930. On his death in 1979 he donated his body to scientific research.

Selected filmography 

 Volonté (1917) - Thauziat
 Travail (1920) - Feuillat
 Être aimé pour soi-même (1920) - Le duc de Castry - un noble milliardaire
 Le secret de Rosette Lambert (1920) - Lambert
 Une fleur dans les ronces (1921) - Le secrétaire
 Les parias de l'amour (1921) - Petit-Costaud
 La résurrection du Bouif (1922) - Le comte de Saint Gaudens
 Rapax (1922) - Georges Castillon
 L'île sans nom (1922) - Le commandant Edouard de Herche
 La bête traquée (1923) - Aubertel
 L'espionne (1923) - Tekli
 Jean Chouan (1926) - Le marquis de Thorigné
 Napoleon (1927) - Antoine Quentin Fouquier de Tinville dit Fouquier-Tinville (uncredited)
 Fleur d'amour (1927) - L'officier
 Verdun: Visions of History (1928)
 La meilleure maîtresse (1929) - Un employé
 The Dream (1931) - Hubert
 Verdun, souvenirs d'histoire (1931) - Le soldat français
 Coeur de lilas (1932) - Merlu
 Un homme sans nom (1932) - Le docteur Alfred Sander
 Coeurs joyeux (1932)
 The Star of Valencia (1933) - Le capitaine Rustan
 Mannequins (1933) - L'inspecteur
 Le voleur (1933) - Mr. Zambault
 Fedora (1934) - Gretch
 Ces messieurs de la Santé (1934) - Le commissaire
 Toboggan (1934) - Anderson
 La cinquième empreinte (1934) - L'inspecteur Robert
 Three Sailors (1934)
 L'école des contribuables (1934) - Le ministre des finances
 Moscow Nights (1934) - Le président de la cour martiale
    (1935) - Le sous-directeur de la Sûreté
 Gangster malgré lui (1935)
 Napoléon Bonaparte (1935) - Antoine Quentin Fouqier de Tinville dit Fouquier-Tinville (uncredited)
 Stradivarius (1935)
 Flight Into Darkness (1935) - Le soldat du 54e (uncredited)
 Moïse et Salomon parfumeurs (1935) - Supervielle
 Gaspard de Besse (1935) - Le juge Cocarel
 Taras Bulba (1936) - Prince Zamnitzky
 Sous la terreur (1936) - Yel
 A Legionnaire (1936) - Le colonel
 The King (1936) - Lelorrain
 Monsieur Personne (1936) - Le commissaire
 The New Men (1936) - D'Amade
 À nous deux, madame la vie (1937) - Gaston
 The Red Dancer (1937) - Le commissaire
 The Citadel of Silence (1937) - Vladorowsky
 J'accuse! (1938) - Le capitaine
 Young and Innocent (1938) - Delmas - un policier
  (1938) - Le commissaire
 The Lafarge Case (1938) - Le procureur
 Crossroads (1938) - Le président
 Women's Prison (1938) - Le procureur 
 Three from St Cyr (1939) - Le général
 Angelica (1939) - Iramundi
 Entente cordiale (1939) - Le prince de Bulow
 Savage Brigade (1939)
 Madame Sans-Gêne (1941) - Maximilen de Robespierre
 Monsieur La Souris (1942) - Le commissaire Lucas
 L'aventure est au coin de la rue (1944) - L'inspecteur Pillot
 Manon, a 326 (1945)
 Peloton d'exécution (1945)
 L'ange qu'on m'a donné (1946)
 The Queen's Necklace (1946) - Maître Doillot, l'avocat de Jeanne
 Martin Roumagnac (1946) - Le président du tribunal
 The Royalists (1947) - Le comte de Beauvent
 The Mysterious Monsieur Sylvain (1947) - Le colonel
 Miroir (1947) - (uncredited)
 Fantômas (1947) - Le directeur de la Sûreté
 La grande Maguet (1947) - Le professeur
 Third at Heart (1947) - Le président du tribunal
 Secret Cargo (1947) - Le gouverneur
 Ruy Blas (1948) - Le marquis de Santa Cruz
 Dilemma of Two Angels (1948) - Le chef
 Du Guesclin (1949) - Le duc d'Anjou
 Orpheus (1950) - Judge (uncredited)
 La peau d'un homme (1951) - Lejeune
 Dakota 308 (1951) - L'inspecteur Joly
 La Fugue de Monsieur Perle (1952) - Le commissaire
 Flesh and the Woman (1954) - Le capitaine
 Interdit de séjour (1955) - (uncredited)
 Nana (1955) - Le commisaire (uncredited)
 Alerte au deuxième bureau (1956) - Morel
 Famous Love Affairs (1961) - L'autre chevalier du Gurthenberg (segment "Agnès Bernauer") (uncredited)
 The Count of Monte Cristo (1961) - Le président de la Chambre des pairs
 Le glaive et la balance (1963) - Un homme
 Germinal (1963) - Un officiel (uncredited)
 Graduation Year (1964) - Le général
 Le Cercle rouge (1970) - L'inspecteur général de la police
 There's No Smoke Without Fire (1973) - Le docteur
 The Inheritor (1973) - Hugo Cordell
 There's No Smoke Without Fire (1973) - Georges Arnaud
 The Train (1973) - François dit Verdun - un ancien combattant (final film role)

External links 

1886 births
1979 deaths
French male film actors
French male silent film actors
20th-century French male actors